Locomobile may refer to:

Transport
 Locomobile Company of America, a US company that made automobiles under the brand name "Locomobile" from 1899 to 1929
 Steam-powered agricultural and haulage vehicles:  
 Traction engine
 Portable engine
 Steam tractor

Fiction
 Locomobiles, in Robert Sobel's alternate history book For Want of a Nail

See also
 Road locomotive (disambiguation)
 Road train
 Locomotive
 Automobile